Qaṣabah aṭ-Ṭafīlah is one of the districts  of Tafilah governorate, Jordan.

References 

Districts of Jordan